Yeşilyurt (Turkish for "green homeland") may refer to:

Turkish places

Neighborhoods
 Yeşilyurt, Istanbul, a neighborhood of the district of Bakırköy, Istanbul Province
 Yeşilyurt, İzmir, a neighborhood of the district of Karabağlar, İzmir Province

Towns and districts
 Yeşilyurt, Gaziantep, a town in the district of İslahiye, Gaziantep Province
 Yeşilyurt, Malatya, a town and district of Malatya Province
 Yeşilyurt, Muğla, a town in Muğla Province
 Yeşilyurt, Tokat, a town and district of Tokat Province

Villages
 Pentageia, also known as Yeşilyurt, a village in Cyprus
 Yeşilyurt, Alaca
 Yeşilyurt, Ayvacık
 Yeşilyurt, Bartın, a village in the district of Bartın, Bartın Province
 Yeşilyurt, Bayburt, a village in the district of Bayburt, Bayburt Province
 Yeşilyurt, Çay, a village in the district of Çay, Afyonkarahisar Province
 Yeşilyurt, Dinar, a village in the district of Dinar, Afyonkarahisar Province
 Yeşilyurt, Gazipaşa, a village in the district of Gazipaşa, Antalya Province
 Yeşilyurt, Gerger, a village in the district of Gerger, Adıyaman Province
 Yeşilyurt, Gülşehir, a village in the district of Gülşehir, Nevşehir Province
 Yeşilyurt, Haymana, a village in the district of Haymana, Ankara Province
 Yeşilyurt, Horasan
 Yeşilyurt, Karacasu, a village in the district of Karacasu, Aydın Province
 Yeşilyurt, İspir
 Yeşilyurt, Karayazı
 Yeşilyurt, Kemaliye
 Yeşilyurt, Mut, a village in the district of Mut, Mersin Province
 Yeşilyurt, Nallıhan, a village in the district of Nallıhan, Ankara Province
 Yeşilyurt, Sarayköy
 Yeşilyurt, Serik, a village in the district of Serik, Antalya Province
 Yeşilyurt, Söğüt, a village in the district of Söğüt, Bilecik Province
 Yeşilyurt, Şereflikoçhisar, a village in the district of Şereflikoçhisar, Ankara Province
 Yeşilyurt, Taşköprü, a village
 Yeşilyurt, Taşova, a village in the district of Taşova, Amasya Province
 Yeşilyurt, Tut, a village in the district of Tut, Adıyaman Province
 Yeşilyurt, Sungurlu

Other uses
 SV Yeşilyurt, a German football club
 Yeşilyurt Women's Volleyball Team, a Turkish women's volleyball team, from the Yeşilyurt neighborhood of Istanbul

People with the surname
 Erdoğan Yeşilyurt (born 1993), Turkish-German footballer